The BMW X5 (F15) is a mid-size luxury SUV manufactured and marketed worldwide by BMW since 2013. The car was unveiled in the 2013 Frankfurt International Motor Show. Early X5 models include xDrive50i, xDrive30d, M50d. BMW xDrive40d, xDrive35i, xDrive25d, sDrive25d were to be added in December 2013.

The X5 arrived in US showrooms in the fourth quarter of 2013. Early models include sDrive35i, xDrive35i, xDrive50i, followed by xDrive35d in early 2014, and the xDrive40e, a plug-in hybrid variant in 2015.

Concept cars

BMW Concept X5 eDrive (2013)

The BMW Concept X5 eDrive is a plug-in hybrid concept vehicle version of the X5 with kidney grille slats, air intake bars and the inlay in the rear bumper in the BMW i Blue colour; Silverflake metallic body colour, xDrive all-wheel-drive system, specially designed roof rails, a connector for the charging cable that lights up during charging, 21-inch light-alloy wheels in an exclusive aerodynamically optimised design, a four-cylinder BMW TwinPower Turbo combustion engine and a  electric motor developed by the BMW Group, a charging cable stored in the load area below the flat storage compartment and BMW ConnectedDrive with Remote app.

The vehicle was unveiled at the 2013 Frankfurt International Motor Show. The production model was named BMW X5 xDrive40e.

BMW Concept X5 Security Plus (2013)

The BMW Concept X5 Security Plus is an armoured version of BMW X5 xDrive50i with protection level VR6, with armoured passenger cell constructed from high-performance steel mouldings and panels, sealed joints, security glass, Intelligent Emergency Call system and optional BMW ConnectedDrive. Other options included LED strobe lights in the radiator grille, roof beacons with a siren system and an auxiliary battery.

The vehicle was unveiled at the 2013 Frankfurt International Motor Show.

Production models

BMW X5 M50d, BMW Individual range, Original BMW Accessories (2013-)
The BMW X5 M50d includes Adaptive M suspension (Dynamic Damper Control and air suspension at the rear axle, Electric Power Steering) and 19-inch M light-alloy wheels in double-spoke design, mixed tyres. The optional Dynamic adaptive suspension package includes Dynamic Performance Control and Dynamic Drive active roll stabilisation.

The BMW Individual range includes additional customisation options, such as up to seven layers of paint (including Ruby Black metallic and Pyrite Brown metallic) and the addition of special colour pigments creating iridescent effects, 20-inch BMW Individual light-alloy wheels in V-spoke design with mixed tyres, fine-grain full Merino leather trim in Amaro Brown and Criollo Brown from BMW Individual and BMW Individual interior trim strips in Piano Finish Black or Sen Light Brown.

Original BMW Accessories range for the BMW X5 include floor mats (with rubber surface integrated in the foot area), luggage compartment mats, transport bags (includes a Storage Bag Fond), seat organiser, ski and snowboard bag (max 4 pairs of skis or 3 snowboards, integrated rollers, handles and a shoulder strap) and transport bag for ski boots, helmets and gloves.

The BMW Individual range was scheduled to be available from December 2013.

X5 M
The BMW M performance derivative of the F15 X5 is designated F85 and was released in 2015. The engine has M TwinPower Turbo and Valvetronic technologies, to deliver a 0– time of 4.2 seconds.

An M-tuned xDrive all-wheel drive system provides traction. It distributes drive between the front and rear axles, while Dynamic Performance Control distributes torque between the 21-inch M Double-spoke light-alloy wheels.

X5 xDrive40e

The BMW X5 xDrive40e is the first plug-in hybrid released under the core BMW brand. The use of BMW's eDrive technology on the established X5 platform is a direct technology transfer from the BMW i cars, in particular, from the BMW i8 technology.

The X5 xDrive40e features a 2.0 L turbocharged gasoline engine  coupled to a  electric motor and a 9.0 kWh battery.

The production of the plug-in hybrid variant was scheduled to begin in April 2015. Retail deliveries (US) began in October of 2015.

The US EPA rated the X5 xDrive40e combined city/highway fuel economy at  equivalent (MPG-e) in all-electric mode (energy consumption of 59 kW-hrs/100 mi).

BMW X5 sDrive35i
BMW introduced the sDrive rear-wheel drive system with this generation of X5. sDrive aimed to increase agility over traditional rear-wheel drive SUVs.

BMW X5 emergency vehicles (2014-)
The BMW X5 has been made into emergency response vehicles with the engines sDrive25d, xDrive30d and xDrive40d.

The vehicle was unveiled at the 14th RETTmobil trade fair in Fulda (xDrive30d).

Specifications

Design
At the front F15 takes design from F30 3 Series while at the back it's similar to other current X series models. The interior now features 10.25 inch display. The exterior, designed by BMW designer Mark Johnson, was approved in November 2010 and production finalised in 2011.

Technology
BMW claims the new X5 is made of ultra-high-tensile steel in the body structure, thermoplastics in the side panels, aluminium in the bonnet and magnesium in the instrument panel support to make the new BMW X5 lighter. Depending on the model, the new X5 is as much as  lighter than a comparably equipped corresponding model from the previous X5 generation.

Equipment

In 2013, model-specific BMW Individual options were added to the optional extras already available for all engine variants of the new BMW X5. Options included BMW Individual fine-grain Merino leather trim in Criollo Brown and Amaro Brown (stitching and piping in a contrasting colour and decorative perforations on the seat surfaces), BMW Individual interior trim strips in Piano Finish Black and Sen Light Brown fine wood, 20-inch BMW Individual light-alloy wheels in V-spoke design with mixed tyres and additional body colours (Mineral Silver, Glacier Silver and Imperial Blue diamond effect metallic paint variants; BMW Individual finishes Ruby Black metallic and Pyrite Brown metallic).

New for the F15 X5 was a high-end Bang and Olufsen premium surround-sound system, which included sixteen speakers, a 5.1-channel external amplifier, and metal speaker grilles. In addition, a Harman Kardon premium audio system, also featuring sixteen speakers and a 600-watt amplifier, was also available as an upgrade to the standard nine-speaker "Hi-Fi" audio system. 

Traffic Jam Assistant option for Driving Assistant Plus, improved BMW Parking Assistant (accelerator, brake pedal, gear shift controls) became available for BMW X5 from December 2013.

For the 2018 model year, all F15 X5 models were equipped with the new BMW iDrive 6.0 sixth-generation infotainment system, which included a touchscreen display for the first time in addition to the iDrive controller in the center console. Wireless Apple CarPlay smartphone integration also became available as a standalone option for vehicles equipped with the GPS navigation system.

M Performance Parts can be fitted to 25-50 models with the M Sport trim.

Full M models have their own M Performance Parts. These include black kidney grilles, a carbon fibre gear selector, a sport steering wheel, carbon fibre mirrors, black side vents, carbon fibre trim and fuel filler cap.

Engines

Petrol

Diesel 

* North American xDrive35d models used the six-cylinder engine from the European-specification xDrive30d models. Vehicles with Diesel engine sold in the United States were since end of 2008 equipped with selective catalysator using Diesel exhaust fluid (DEF) to reduce NOx emissions, while vehicles sold in Europe had a bypass exhaust pipe only due to the regulations which ended up in Dieselgate.

Gearbox
All models include an 8-speed Steptronic automatic gearbox.

Performance

Production
BMW X5 and the corresponding Security models were built in BMW Spartanburg plant in the USA. X5 Security's special security features themselves are installed in the Toluca plant in Mexico.

In 2015 it has shown 50% increase in Russia, being the most frequently bought BMW in Russia.

See also 
 VinFast LUX SA2.0

References

External links

 BMW pages: X5 Security Plus, Concept X5 eDrive

X5
F15
Cars introduced in 2013
Mid-size sport utility vehicles
Luxury sport utility vehicles
Plug-in hybrid vehicles